Tom Erik Packalén (born 5 October 1969) is a Finnish politician, police commissioner and member of the Finnish Parliament representing the Finns Party. 

Packalén was born in Helsinki, and was first elected to the parliament in 2011. He was re-elected in 2015 with 5,089 personal votes and in 2019 with 2,028 votes. Packalén has also been a member of the City Council of Helsinki since 2012.

References

1969 births
Living people
Politicians from Helsinki
Finns Party politicians
Members of the Parliament of Finland (2011–15)
Members of the Parliament of Finland (2015–19)
Members of the Parliament of Finland (2019–23)